Jeremy Joan Peña (born September 22, 1997) is a Dominican-American professional baseball shortstop for the Houston Astros of Major League Baseball (MLB).  He attended the University of Maine and played college baseball for the Black Bears.  The Astros selected Peña in the third round of the 2018 MLB draft, and he made his MLB debut in 2022.

In 2022, Peña became the first rookie shortstop to win a Gold Glove Award and the first to hit a home run in the World Series. During the Astros' 2022 championship run, Peña was named Most Valuable Player (MVP) of both the American League Championship Series (ALCS) and World Series (WS), becoming the first American League (AL) player to earn both awards in the same year. He was the youngest position player to win the World Series MVP award.

Early life and amateur career
Jeremy Peña was born and raised in Santo Domingo, Dominican Republic, before he and his family moved to Providence, Rhode Island, when he was nine years old.  His father, Gerónimo, was an infielder in Major League Baseball (MLB) who played for the St. Louis Cardinals and Cleveland Indians from 1990 to 1996.  Jeremy attended Classical High School in Providence, playing baseball and running track and cross country. In 2014, his junior year, he batted .352. As a senior in 2015, he hit .390 with two home runs. Following his senior year, he was selected by the Atlanta Braves in the 39th round of the 2015 MLB draft, but he did not sign,  Instead, he enrolled with the University of Maine where he played college baseball.

As a freshman at Maine in 2016, Peña started and played in 55 games, batting .283 with one home run, 15 RBIs, and 11 stolen bases, earning a spot on the America East Conference All-Rookie Team. That summer, he played in the New England Collegiate Baseball League with the Plymouth Pilgrims. In 2017, Peña's sophomore year, he started 54 games and hit .319 with six home runs and 32 RBIs. Following the season, he played in the Cape Cod Baseball League with the Chatham Anglers, earning All-Star honors. In 2018, as a junior, he once again started 54 games, hitting .308/.393/.469 with five home runs, 28 RBIs, and ten stolen bases, earning American East Second-Team honors.

Professional career

Minor leagues
The Houston Astros selected Peña in the third round of the 2018 MLB draft.  Peña signed with Houston and made his professional debut with the Tri-City ValleyCats of the Class A Short Season New York-Penn League, batting .250 with one home run and ten RBIs over 36 games, earning All-Star honors.  In 2019, Peña began the year with the Quad Cities River Bandits of the Class A Midwest League, with whom he was named an All-Star, before being promoted to the Fayetteville Woodpeckers of the Class A-Advanced Carolina League in June. Over 109 games between the two teams, he slashed .303/.385/.440 with seven home runs, 54 RBIs, and 20 stolen bases. After the season, he played in the Arizona Fall League with the Peoria Javelinas.

Peña did not play a minor league game in 2020 due to the cancellation of the minor league season caused by the COVID-19 pandemic. On April 21, 2021, it was announced that Peña would undergo surgery on his left wrist, causing him to miss part of the season. He was activated off the injured list in late August, and was assigned to the Sugar Land Skeeters of the Triple-A West. Over 30 games, he slashed .287/.346/.598 with ten home runs and 19 RBIs.

Upon conclusion of the 2021–22 Dominican Professional Baseball League season, Peña was awarded a second consecutive Gold Glove at shortstop.  In 30 games, he produced a .970 fielding percentage, 5.7 range factor, nine double plays turned along with five errors.

Houston Astros
On November 19, 2021, the Astros selected Peña's contract and added him to their 40-man roster.  Following the departure of incumbent shortstop Carlos Correa via free agency, Peña was named starting shortstop during 2022 spring training.  He made his major league debut on Opening Day versus the Los Angeles Angels.  On April 8, 2022, Peña hit his first major league home run while his parents were being interviewed during the broadcast.  On April 24, he hit his first career walk-off home run in the bottom of the 10th inning versus the Toronto Blue Jays, helping lead the Astros to an 8–7 win.  On May 17, Peña hit the third of five Astros home runs in the second inning versus starter Nathan Eovaldi of the Boston Red Sox, tying the major league record for home runs hit by a team in one inning as the Astros rolled to a 13–4 victory.

On June 13, 2022, Peña sustained a left thumb injury versus the Texas Rangers and was placed on the 10-day injured list. The Astros activated him on June 26. On July 3, Peña produced his both first career four-hit and multi-homer game, as well as his second career walk-off home run, sealing a 4–2 win over the Angels.

Over the 2022 regular season, Peña batted .253./289/.426 with 132 hits, 22 home runs, 63 RBIs, 72 runs scored, 11 stolen bases, 22 walks, 135 strikeouts, and had the lowest walk/strikeout ratio in the majors (0.16).  He tied Correa for the franchise rookie record for most home runs by a shortstop.  Peña also ranked second in home runs, fourth in hits, and fifth in runs scored and RBIs among major league rookies. He had the fastest sprint speed on the Astros, at 29.4 feet per second.

On defense, Peña ranked second in the American League (AL) in Defensive Wins Above Replacement (2.4, dWAR), third in the AL in errors committed (19), and third among AL shortstops in total zone runs (8).  He played 134 games at shortstop, starting 132 of them.  He was graded 15 defensive runs better than “average” at shortstop.

Making his postseason debut in the American League Division Series (ALDS), Peña singled to precede a Yordan Álvarez game-winning home run in both of the first two games.  The third game—which featured a postsesason-record 17 scoreless innings—was decided by Peña's home run in the top of the 18th inning off Penn Murfee.  His first career home run on the postseason stage, it thus concluded the longest shutout game in postseason history, 1–0, and clinched an ALDS sweep for Houston.  Peña was named the Most Valuable Player (MVP) of the American League Championship Series (ALCS), hitting .353 with two home runs in the Astros' four-game sweep of the New York Yankees.  In Game 5 of the World Series, he homered off Noah Syndergaard to become the first rookie shortstop to hit a home run in World Series play.  The Astros won the World Series in six games, and Peña became the third rookie ever to be named the World Series MVP.  He also become the first American League (AL) player–and ninth overall–to win both LCS and WS MVP honors in the same year.

Awards and honors
Although he finished fifth in the AL Rookie of the Year (ROY) rankings, Peña was awarded the AL 2022 Gold Glove Award for his play at shortstop. He became the first Astros rookie to win a Gold Glove, and the first rookie ever to win a Gold Glove at shortstop in MLB history.

The Houston chapter of the Baseball Writers' Association of America (BBWAA) named Peña the Astros' Rookie of the Year.

On November 30, 2022, Peña was awarded the Key to the City of Providence in a 90-minute ceremony attended by officials including Rhode Island Governor Dan McKee and Mayor Jorge Elorza

See also

 Houston Astros award winners and league leaders
 List of Major League Baseball players from the Dominican Republic
 List of second-generation Major League Baseball players

References

External links

1997 births
Living people
Major League Baseball players from the Dominican Republic
Baseball players from Providence, Rhode Island
Major League Baseball shortstops
Houston Astros players
Maine Black Bears baseball players
Chatham Anglers players
Tri-City ValleyCats players
Quad Cities River Bandits players
Fayetteville Woodpeckers players
Sugar Land Skeeters players
Peoria Javelinas players
Estrellas Orientales players
Gold Glove Award winners
American League Championship Series MVPs
World Series Most Valuable Player Award winners
Florida Complex League Astros players
2023 World Baseball Classic players